Debra Lynelle Fischer (born March 1, 1951) is an American politician serving as the senior United States senator from Nebraska, a seat she has held since 2013. A member of the Republican Party, Fischer was the first woman elected to a full term as a U.S. senator from Nebraska, and previously served in the Nebraska Legislature, representing the 43rd district for two terms from 2005 to 2013.

Early life, education, and career 
Fischer was born Debra Lynelle Strobel on March 1, 1951, in Lincoln, Nebraska. She is the daughter of Florence M. (née Bock) and Gerold Carl Strobel. Her father was the State Engineer/Director of the Nebraska Department of Roads under Governors Kay Orr and Ben Nelson and her mother was an elementary school teacher with Lincoln Public Schools.

In 1972, Strobel married Bruce Fischer, from Valentine, Nebraska; she had met him at the University of Nebraska–Lincoln. She and her husband raised three sons on the Fischer family cattle ranch south of Valentine. In 1987, she returned to the university and completed her B.S. degree in education.

School board (1990–2004)
In 1990, Fischer was elected to the Valentine Rural High School Board of Education, serving until 2004. Governor Mike Johanns appointed Fischer as a Commissioner to the Nebraska Coordinating Commission for Post-Secondary Education from 2000 to 2004.

Nebraska Legislature (2005–2013)

Elections
In 2004, Fischer ran for the Nebraska Legislature from the 43rd legislative district in the state's Sandhills region. In the nonpartisan primary, she came in second in a field of seven, receiving 2226 votes (25.1%); front-runner Kevin T. Cooksley received 2264 votes (25.5%). In the general election, she defeated Cooksley with 8178 votes to his 8050, for a margin of 50.4%–49.6%.

In 2008, she won re-election unopposed. Nebraska's term-limits law precluded her running for re-election in 2012.

Tenure

Fischer's district was geographically the largest in the Nebraska Legislature, comprising 12 counties and part of a 13th. During her tenure in the legislature, she did a weekly radio show on seven stations covering her district, and wrote a weekly column printed in several newspapers.

In 2007, she helped to filibuster a bill that created a statewide smoking ban for indoor workplaces and public places.

In 2009, Fischer was one of fourteen co-sponsors of L.B. 675, which required abortion providers to display ultrasound images of the fetus at least one hour prior to the abortions, in a position where the abortion seeker could easily view them.  A spokesman for the National Right to Life Committee stated that the Nebraska law was stronger than those of other states, which only required that the client be asked if she wanted to see an ultrasound image.  The measure passed by a 40–5 vote, and was signed into law by Governor Dave Heineman.

Fischer served as chairwoman for the Transportation and Telecommunications Committee and helped pass the BUILD Nebraska Act through the Unicameral. This bill prioritized a quarter cent of the state sales tax for infrastructure projects.

U.S. Senate (2013–present)

Elections

2012 election

Primary
In January 2012, after incumbent Democratic Senator Ben Nelson announced his retirement, Fischer officially announced she would run for the U.S. Senate.  The Republican primary campaign was expected to shape up as a battle between Attorney General Jon Bruning and State Treasurer Don Stenberg; Fischer and three less well-known candidates were also on the ballot.

During the primary campaign, Fischer was criticized by environmentalists and others because her family's ranch near Valentine grazed cattle on federal land, leasing it for about $110,000 per year less than the market rate on private land. Opponents of federal grazing leases argued that she should relinquish her family's permit if she wants to remain "morally consistent" with her message of less government. Fischer argued that the poor quality of federal lands, plus the restrictions that come with federal leases, make it inappropriate to compare them to private leases.

Throughout the campaign, Fischer was outspent by Bruning, who raised $3.6 million, and Stenberg, who spent $865,000.  Fischer's campaign raised only $440,000.  However, Bruning and Stenberg spent much of their resources attacking one another; Fischer benefitted from the damage that each did to the other's approval ratings.  She was also aided by $725,000 in television ads bought by the Club for Growth attacking Bruning.  Shortly before the election, she was endorsed by Nebraska U.S. Representative Jeff Fortenberry and by 2008 Vice-Presidential candidate Sarah Palin, who recorded robocalls endorsing her; and a super PAC financed by former Omaha businessman Joe Ricketts paid for $250,000 worth of television advertising promoting Fischer and opposing Bruning.

Fischer won the primary election with 40% of the vote. Bruning ranked second with 35%, and Stenberg ranked third with 18%. Fischer took a plurality of votes in 75 of Nebraska's 93 counties. Bruning won 15 counties and Schuyler businessman Pat Flynn received a plurality in his home Colfax County. Fischer and Bruning tied in Kimball and Sioux counties.

General election
In the general election, Fischer faced Democrat Bob Kerrey, a former Nebraska governor and U.S. senator, who was running for the seat that he had held from 1989 to 2001.

Fischer maintained that their intent in filing the suit was to obtain a more manageable boundary for their ranch, after repeated attempts to purchase the land had failed; an Omaha World-Herald analysis stated that the Kerrey campaign's statements regarding Fischer's actions in the Legislature failed to mention her support for a compromise measure that would have allowed NGPC to buy the land. A Fischer spokesman accused Kerrey of "reckless disregard for the truth" and "gutter politics" in the matter.

In the general election, Fischer defeated Kerrey 58%–42%.  Fischer won mainly by swamping Kerrey in the state's rural areas.  She won 88 of Nebraska's 93 counties. Kerrey only won Douglas, Lancaster, Saline, Thurston, and Dakota counties.

2018 election

Fischer was re-elected to the U.S. Senate in 2018, defeating Democratic challenger Jane Raybould by a significant margin.

Tenure

Fischer became the third female U.S. Senator in Nebraska's history, and the first since 1954.  She was the first elected to a full term: of the earlier woman Senators, Eva Bowring was appointed in 1954 to occupy the seat vacated by the death of Dwight Griswold until a special election could be held to replace him later that year; Hazel Abel won that special election to finish Griswold's term, but did not seek a full term.

Fischer has expressed support for an amendment to the U.S. Constitution limiting senators to two six-year terms and representatives to three two-year terms. She pledged to "limit herself to two terms in office". She further stated that members of the U.S. Congress should be placed under a lifetime ban from becoming federally registered lobbyists.

Committee assignments
Committee on Agriculture, Nutrition, and Forestry
Subcommittee on Livestock, Marketing, and Agriculture Security
Committee on Armed Services
Subcommittee on Emerging Threats and Capabilities
Subcommittee on Readiness and Management Support
Subcommittee on Strategic Forces (Ranking Member)
Committee on Commerce, Science and Transportation
Subcommittee on Aviation Operations, Safety, and Security
Subcommittee on Competitiveness, Innovation, and Export Promotion
Subcommittee on Consumer Protection, Product Safety, and Insurance
Subcommittee on Oceans, Atmosphere, Fisheries, and Coast Guard 
Subcommittee on Surface Transportation and Merchant Marine Infrastructure, Safety, and Security (Ranking Member)
Committee on Rules and Administration
Select Committee on Ethics

Political positions
The American Conservative Union's Center for Legislative Accountability gave Fischer a lifetime rating of 81.12 as of 2021. The politically liberal Americans for Democratic Action gave her a 2019 score of 0%.

Climate change
Fischer rejects conclusions by the international scientific community that human emissions of greenhouse gases are the primary cause of global warming in recent decades. In May 2015, a legislative aide said, "the senator acknowledges the climate is changing but believes it is due to natural cycles."

Gun access
After the 2016 Orlando nightclub shooting, Fischer said any legislative proposals to restrict people on the terrorist watchlist from buying guns would not stop mass shootings. She said that preventing self-radicalization was more important than restricting gun access.

Border control
Fischer supports sending more troops to patrol the United States-Mexico border and opposes college benefits for undocumented immigrants.

LGBTQ rights
In June 2020, Fischer expressed support for the Supreme Court decision in Bostock v. Clayton County that "extended Civil Rights Act protections to gay, lesbian and transgender workers", saying, "It's important that we recognize that all Americans have equal rights under our Constitution. I'm fine with it."

2020 presidential election
Before the January 6, 2021, United States Electoral College vote count, Fischer announced that she would vote to certify the election results. Fischer was on Capitol Hill to participate in the count when Trump supporters stormed the U.S. Capitol. During the attack, Fischer tweeted that "These rioters have no constitutional right to harm law enforcement and storm our Capitol. We are a nation of laws, not some banana republic. This must end now."

On May 28, 2021, Fischer voted against creating an independent commission to investigate the 2021 United States Capitol attack.

Personal life
Fischer and her husband Bruce operate a family ranch, Sunny Slope Ranch, near Valentine, Nebraska. Their adult sons Adam, Morgan, and Luke own the majority of the stock in the family corporation, while the elder Fischers retain a minority share. In 2020, Fischer and her husband moved to Lincoln, Nebraska.

Electoral history

See also
 Women in the United States Senate

References

Further reading
 "Sen. Deb Fischer – District 43 – Biography". Nebraska Legislature. Retrieved 2012-03-16. Archived from original 2012-06-05.
 "Outstanding LEAD Alum". Nebraska LEAD Alumni Association. Retrieved 2012-05-19.

External links

Senator Deb Fischer official U.S. Senate website
Campaign website

 

|-

|-

|-

1951 births
21st-century American politicians
21st-century American women politicians
American Presbyterians
Female United States senators
Living people
Republican Party Nebraska state senators
People from Valentine, Nebraska
Politicians from Lincoln, Nebraska
Protestants from Nebraska
Ranchers from Nebraska
Republican Party United States senators from Nebraska
University of Nebraska–Lincoln alumni
Women state legislators in Nebraska